Backhousia enata is a flowering plant in the family Myrtaceae, native to Northeastern Queensland.

It is a multi-stemmed large shrub or tree with rough grey-brown bark on the main trunk.
The leaves are glossy and can have a strong aroma that can be described as a menthol smell.
It has white flowers arranged in groups of three to six individual flowers.

References 

Myrtales of Australia
enata
Taxa described in 2005